The COVID-19 pandemic in Togo is part of the ongoing worldwide pandemic of coronavirus disease 2019 caused by severe acute respiratory syndrome coronavirus 2. The virus was confirmed to have reached Togo in March 2020.


Background 
On 12 January 2020, the World Health Organization (WHO) confirmed that a novel coronavirus was the cause of a respiratory illness in a cluster of people in Wuhan City, Hubei Province, China, which was reported to the WHO on 31 December 2019.

The case fatality ratio for COVID-19 has been much lower than SARS of 2003, but the transmission has been significantly greater, with a significant total death toll.

In September 2021, Togo is extending the state of health emergency until September 2022 following the upsurge in new cases of coronavirus in recent weeks. Access to administrative buildings is now subject to presentation of a COVID-19 vaccine pass.

Timeline

March 2020 
 On 6 March, Togolese authorities announced the first COVID-19 case, a 42-year-old Togolese woman who travelled between Germany, France, Turkey, and Benin before returning to Togo. On this date, it was reported that she was being treated in isolation and her condition was stable.

 On 20 March, nine more cases were confirmed in Togo. On this day, the first case recovered, as indicated by the Ministry of Health.

 On 21 March, seven more cases were confirmed. In an attempt to control the spread of the virus in Togo, all borders to the country were closed. The cities of Lomé, Tsévié, Kpalimé, and Sokodé were quarantined starting on 20 March for two weeks.

 On 27 March, the first death occurred.

 By the end of March there had been 34 confirmed cases, of which 1 patient had died and 10 had recovered, leaving 23 active cases.

April to June 2020 
 During April there were 82 new cases, bringing the total number of confirmed cases to 116. The death toll rose to 9 and the number of recovered patients increased to 65, leaving 42 active cases at the end of the month (83% higher than at the end of March).

 In May there were 326 new cases, bringing the total number of confirmed cases to 442. Four more patients died, raising the total death toll to 13, and the number of recovered patients grew to 211, leaving 218 active cases at the end of May.

 In June there were 201 new cases, bringing the total number of confirmed cases to 643. The death toll increased by one person to 14, while the number of recovered patients rose by 184 to 395, leaving 234 active cases at the end of the month (an increase by 7% from the previous month).

July to September 2020 
 During July there were 284 new cases, bringing the total number of confirmed cases to 927. Four more died, raising the death toll to 18. The number of recovered patients increased to 628, leaving 281 active cases at the end of the month (an increase by 20% from the end of June).

 In August there were 473 new cases, raising the total number of confirmed cases to 1400. The death toll increased to 28. There were 367 active cases at the end of the month (31% higher than at the end of July).

 There were 359 new cases in September, bringing the total number of confirmed cases to 1759. The death toll rose to 48. The number of recovered patients increased to 1341, leaving 370 active cases at the end of the month.

October to December 2020 
 There were 598 new cases in October, bringing the total number of confirmed cases to 2357. The death toll rose to 57. The number of recovered patients increased to 1686, leaving 614 active cases at the end of the month.

 There were 617 new cases in November, bringing the total number of confirmed cases to 2974. The death toll rose to 64. The number of recovered patients increased to 2478, leaving 432 active cases at the end of the month.

 There were 637 new cases in December, taking the total number of confirmed cases to 3611. The death toll rose to 68. The number of recovered patients increased to 3384, leaving 159 active cases at the end of the month.

January to March 2021 
 There were 1463 new cases in January, taking the total number of confirmed cases to 5074. The death toll rose to 77. The number of recovered patients increased to 4268, leaving 729 active cases at the end of the month.

 There were 1827 new cases in February, taking the total number of confirmed cases to 6901. The death toll rose to 84. The number of recovered patients increased to 5660, leaving 1157 active cases at the end of the month.

 Vaccinations started on 10 March, initially with 156,000 doses of AstraZeneca's Covishield vaccine delivered through the COVAX mechanism.

 There were 3348 new cases in March, taking the total number of confirmed cases to 10249. The death toll rose to 109. The number of recovered patients increased to 7815, leaving 2325 active cases at the end of the month.

April to June 2021 
 Togo received 140,000 doses of the Oxford-AstraZeneca vaccine which the Democratic Republic of Congo had been unable to use before the expiry date.

 There were 2682 new cases in April, taking the total number of confirmed cases to 12931. The death toll rose to 123. The number of recovered patients increased to 11045, leaving 1763 active cases at the end of the month.

 There were 526 new cases in May, taking the total number of confirmed cases to 13457. The death toll rose to 125. The number of recovered patients increased to 12808, leaving 524 active cases at the end of the month.

 There were 424 new cases in June, taking the total number of confirmed cases to 13881. The death toll rose to 129. The number of recovered patients increased to 13506, leaving 246 active cases at the end of the month.

July to September 2021 
 There were 1917 new cases in July, taking the total number of confirmed cases to 15798. The death toll rose to 152. The number of recovered patients increased to 14450, leaving 1196 active cases at the end of the month.

 There were 5763 new cases in August, raising the total number of confirmed cases to 21561. The death toll rose to 185. The number of recovered patients increased to 16926, leaving 4450 active cases at the end of the month.

 There were 3868 new cases in September, raising the total number of confirmed cases to 25429. The death toll rose to 229. The number of recovered patients increased to 23061, leaving 2139 active cases at the end of the month.

October to December 2021 
 There were 650 new cases in October, bringing the total number of confirmed cases to 26079. The death toll rose to 242. The number of recovered patients increased to 25579, leaving 258 active cases at the end of the month.

 There were 186 new cases in November, bringing the total number of confirmed cases to 26265. The death toll rose to 243. The number of recovered patients increased to 25915, leaving 107 active cases at the end of the month.

 Togo's first cases of the omicron variant were announced on 20 December.

 There were 4408 new cases in December, raising the total number of confirmed cases to 30673. The death toll rose to 248. The number of recovered patients increased to 26167, leaving 4258 active cases at the end of the month. Modelling by WHO's Regional Office for Africa suggests that due to under-reporting, the true number of infections by the end of 2021 was around 3.7 million while the true number of COVID-19 deaths was around one thousand.

January to March 2022 
 There were 5818 new cases in January, raising the total number of confirmed cases to 36491. The death toll rose to 268. The number of recovered patients increased to 32541, leaving 3682 active cases at the end of the month.

 There were 307 new cases in February, bringing the total number of confirmed cases to 36798. The death toll rose to 272. The number of recovered patients increased to 36410, leaving 116 active cases at the end of the month.

 There were 145 new cases in March, bringing the total number of confirmed cases to 36943. The death toll remained unchanged. The number of recovered patients increased to 36591, leaving 80 active cases at the end of the month.

April to June 2022 
 There were 48 new cases in April, bringing the total number of confirmed cases to 36991. The death toll rose to 273. The number of recovered patients increased to 36693, leaving 25 active cases at the end of the month.

 There were 94 new cases in May, bringing the total number of confirmed cases to 37085. The death toll remained unchanged.

 There were 363 new cases in June, bringing the total number of confirmed cases to 37448. The death toll rose to 275. The number of recovered patients increased to 37058, leaving 115 active cases at the end of the month.

July to September 2022 
 There were 644 new cases in July, bringing the total number of confirmed cases to 38092. The death toll rose to 280. The number of recovered patients increased to 37672, leaving 140 active cases at the end of the month.
 There were 408 new cases in August, bringing the total number of confirmed cases to 38500. The death toll rose to 283.
 There were 586 new cases in September, bringing the total number of confirmed cases to 39086. The death toll rose to 285.

October to December 2022 
 There were 218 new cases in October, bringing the total number of confirmed cases to 39304. The death toll rose to 290. The number of recovered patients increased to 39001, leaving 13 active cases at the end of the month.
 There were 26 new cases in November, bringing the total number of confirmed cases to 39330. The death toll remained unchanged.
 There were 14 new cases in December, bringing the total number of confirmed cases to 39344. The death toll remained unchanged.

January to March 2023 
 There were 12 new cases in January, bringing the total number of confirmed cases to 39356. The death toll remained unchanged. The number of recovered patients increased to 39064, leaving two active cases at the end of the month.

Statistics

Confirmed new cases per day

Confirmed deaths per day

Response 

After an extraordinary council of ministers on 16 March, the government announced they would establish an XOF 2 billion fund to fight the pandemic. They also established the following measures: suspending flights from Spain, Italy, France, and Germany; canceling all international events for three weeks; requiring people who were recently in a high-risk country to self-isolate; closing their borders; and prohibiting events with more than 100 people effective 19 March. In accordance with the ban on large gatherings, on 18 March, the Togolese Football Federation suspended competitions. Other events were canceled too, including the FILBLEU literature festival.

Togo provided digital stimulus payments to almost a million residents.

See also 
 COVID-19 pandemic in Africa
 COVID-19 pandemic by country and territory

References

External links 

 
Coronavirus pandemic
Coronavirus pandemic
Togo
Togo
Disease outbreaks in Togo